Blood Will Tell is a 2019 Argentine drama film directed by Miguel Cohan and written by Ana Cohan and Miguel Cohan. Released by Buena Vista International in Argentina on 28 February 2019, Blood Will Tell was released on Netflix on 29 June 2019.

Premise

Cast 
 Oscar Martínez as Elías / Father
 Paulina García as Adriana / Mother
 Dolores Fonzi as Carla / Adriana and Elías' daughter
 Diego Velázquez as Sebastián / Carla's husband
 Luis Gnecco as Lautaro

References

External links 
 
 

2019 films
2019 drama films
Argentine drama films
Argentine mystery films
Spanish-language Netflix original films
2010s Spanish-language films
2010s Argentine films